Ergican Saydam (born March 28, 1929, in İstanbul; died December 21, 2009, in İstanbul) was a Turkish pianist and piano pedagogue. High School, Kabataş Erkek Lisesi.He was an advocate of Turkish composers such as Cemal Reşit Rey, Ahmed Adnan Saygun, Cengiz Tanç and İlhan Usmanbaş whose music he premiered and recorded. His repertory centers around German romantic literature, particularly the music of Ludwig van Beethoven, Franz Schubert and Robert Schumann

Biography
Ergican Saydam studied with Friedrich von Statzer (Ferdi Statzer) in Istanbul Conservatory and with Friedrich Wührer in Staatliche Hochschule für Musik in Munich. Mr. Saydam gave more than 2000 concerts in five continents. He made several recordings of piano literature and also contemporary composers. He also taught at the Mimar Sinan Istanbul Conservatory and was appointed to a professorship. In 1986, Ergican Saydam recorded the world premiere (after the composer) of Franz Liszt's Grande Marche Paraphrase pour Abdul Medjid Khan (Sultan Abdülmecid) composed in 1847. He made also the premiere of Cemal Reşit Rey's second Piano Concerto with Tha Ankara Presidential Symphony Orchestra  under the composers baton. He was the jury for The International Maurice Ravel Piano Competition in 1975. He also received the Bad Gastein, Margrit Ramdohr and Simon Bolivar prizes.

Publications 
Her daughter mezzo-soprano Ezgi Saydam wrote Taburede 60 Yıl | 60 Years on Stool (Arma, 2009)

Discography
He recorded an LP called Turkish Themes including works of Mozart, Beethoven, Liszt and also contemporary Turkish composers such as Ulvi Cemal Erkin, Cenan Akın, Bülent Tarcan and İlhan Usmanbaş. He also made numerous special recordings for the TRT Radio (Turkish National Radio-TV).

1929 births
2009 deaths
Turkish pianists
Musicians from Istanbul
20th-century pianists